Lieutenant General Per Gustaf Sylvan (23 April 1875 – 19 September 1945) was a Swedish Army officer. He served as Chief of the Army from 1937 to 1940.

Early life
Sylvan was born on 23 April 1875 in Malmö, Sweden, the son of Ph.D. Per Gustaf Sylvan (1827–1903) and Tina Löfvengren (1844–1893). He was the brother of major general Ove Sylvan.

Career
Sylvan was commissioned as an officer in 1895 with then rak of underlöjtnant. He attended the Artillery and Engineering College higher course and became a lieutenant in 1898 and did refresher training at the same college from 1900 to 1902. Sylvan was an artillery staff officer from 1902 to 1904 and was an artillery teacher at the Artillery and Engineering College from 1904 to 1912. Sylvan was the leader of the Artillery Committee in 1910 and 1918 to 1920 and the Fortification Committee in 1919. He was promoted to captain in 1907 and major in 1915 and was head of the Artillery and Engineering College from 1915 to 1922.

Sylvan was promoted to lieutenant colonel in 1918 and conducted a study trip to the Austrian front the same year. He was a teacher at the Artillery Shooting School from 1920 to 1925 and was lieutenant colonel at the Wendes Artillery Regiment (A 3) in 1922. Sylvan was head of the artillery measuring course in 1922 and 1923 and was a teacher at the Artillery Shooting School from 1920 to 1925. He was promoted to colonel in 1926 and was chief of the Artillery Staff from 1926 to 1931 and was the head of the Artillery Shooting School from 1927 to 1931. Sylvan underwent tactical course for generals in France in 1927.

He was commanding officer of the Småland Army Artillery Regiment (A 6) from 1931 to 1932. Sylvan was brigade commander of the Eastern Army Division from 1932 to 1935, inspector of the Military Schools from 1932 to 1935 and commanding officer of the Southern Army Division from 1935 to 1937. He was promoted to major general in 1933 and was lieutenant general and Chief of the Army from 1937 to 1940.

Personal life

He married the first time in 1906 with Signild Sylvan (1875–1908). They were the parents of Ph.D. Nils Sylvan (1907–1998). He married a second time in 1913 with Märta Santesson (1884–1963).

Dates of rank
1895 – Underlöjtnant
1898 – Lieutenant
1907 – Captain
1915 – Major
1918 – Lieutenant colonel
1926 – Colonel
1933 – Major general
1937 – Lieutenant general

Awards and decorations
Sylvan's awards:

Swedish
  King Gustaf V's Jubilee Commemorative Medal (1928)
  Commander Grand Cross of the Order of the Sword
  Commander 2st Class of the Order of Vasa
  Knight of the Order of the Polar Star

Foreign
  Grand Cross of the Order of St. Olav
  Commander 2st Class of the Order of the Dannebrog
  Commander of the Order of Orange-Nassau with swords

Honours
Member of the Royal Swedish Academy of War Sciences

Bibliography

References

1875 births
1945 deaths
Swedish Army lieutenant generals
Chiefs of Army (Sweden)
People from Malmö
Members of the Royal Swedish Academy of War Sciences
Commanders Grand Cross of the Order of the Sword
Commanders Second Class of the Order of Vasa
Knights of the Order of the Polar Star